Crossroads was a special episode of Impact! produced by Impact Wrestling, which took place on January 12, 2018 at the Impact Zone in Orlando, Florida and aired on March 8, 2018.

Five professional wrestling matches were contested at the event. In the main event, Austin Aries successfully defended the World Championship against Johnny Impact. On the undercard, Brian Cage and Lashley defeated oVe (Dave Crist and Jake Crist), Allie defeated Laurel Van Ness to win the Knockouts Championship, the Grand Champion Matt Sydal defeated the X Division Champion Taiji Ishimori in a title versus title match and Latin American Xchange (Santana and Ortiz) defeated The Cult of Lee (Caleb Konley and Trevor Lee) to retain the World Tag Team Championship.

Event

Preliminary matches
The event kicked off with The Latin American Xchange (Ortiz and Santana) defended the World Tag Team Championship against The Cult of Lee (Caleb Konley and Trevor Lee). LAX nailed a Street Sweeper to Konley to retain the titles.

Next, the Grand Champion Matt Sydal took on the X Division Champion Taiji Ishimori in a title versus title match, in which both Sydal's Grand Championship and Ishimori's X Division Championship were on the line. Sydal blocked Ishimori's 450° splash with his knees and executed a shooting star press on Ishimori to win the match, thus retaining the Grand Championship and winning the X Division Championship in the process and became a dual titleholder.

Next, Laurel Van Ness defended the Knockouts Championship against Allie. Van Ness tried to hit Allie with the title belt but Allie nailed an Allie Valley Driver and a Best Superkick Ever to Van Ness to win the title.

It was followed by the penultimate match in which Lashley initially took on Ohio Versus Everything (Dave Crist and Jake Crist) in a handicap match. Brian Cage stepped in midway through the match as Lashley's tag team partner. Cage delivered a Drill Claw to Jake for the win. Cage refused to shake Lashley's hand after the match and walked away.

Main event match
In the main event, Austin Aries defended the World Championship against Johnny Impact. Aries avoided a Countdown to Impact by Impact and hit him a Death Valley driver on the apron and a brainbuster to retain the title.

Reception
Larry Csonka of 411 Mania rated Crossroads 7.7 and considered it "a very good and strong show, heavy on wrestling and with nothing bad. Most “themed episodes” of Impact usually feel just like a regular episode of Impact," but Crossroads "felt different in a good way and delivered." He further stated "We got good wrestling, set up for Cage vs. Lashley & Aries vs. Patron, two title changes, and the show absolutely flew by for me, which is always a good thing. Tonight’s show gets a thumbs up, and I hope that they can keep delivering more shows like this one."

Results

References

2018 in professional wrestling
Events in Orlando, Florida
January 2018 sports events in the United States
2018 American television episodes
2010s American television specials
Professional wrestling in Orlando, Florida
2018 in professional wrestling in Florida
Impact Wrestling shows